Edward Orlando Bolaños Angulo (born 14 August 1998) is a Colombian professional footballer who plays for Cortuluá as a forward for Patriotas Boyacá.

Club career
Born in Tumaco, Bolaños represented CD Estudiantil de Medellín and Rionegro Águilas as a youth. He moved to Spain in January 2017, after joining Rayo Vallecano's youth setup on loan.

Bolaños made his senior debut for Rayo's reserve team during the 2017–18 season, in Tercera División. On 20 August 2018, he joined Segunda División B side SD Ponferradina, on loan from Cortuluá; initially assigned to the B-team, he contributed with one goal in 14 appearances (play-offs included) as his side achieved promotion to Segunda División.

Bolaños spent the 2019–20 campaign on loan at CD Guijuelo in the third division and Fútbol Alcobendas Sport in the fourth division, but returned to Ponfe in June 2020, with his club extending his loan deal with Cortuluá for a further year.

Bolaños made his professional debut on 12 September 2020, coming on as a late substitute for Yuri de Souza in a 1–2 home loss against CD Castellón for the second division championship.

References

External links

1998 births
Living people
People from Tumaco
Colombian footballers
Association football forwards
Águilas Doradas Rionegro players
Cortuluá footballers
Patriotas Boyacá footballers
Segunda División players
Segunda División B players
Tercera División players
Rayo Vallecano B players
SD Ponferradina B players
SD Ponferradina players
CD Guijuelo footballers
CD Paracuellos Antamira players
Colombian expatriate footballers
Colombian expatriate sportspeople in Spain
Expatriate footballers in Spain
Sportspeople from Nariño Department